Dhi Al-Hawd and Ma'yin is a sub-district located in Dhi al-Sufal District, Ibb Governorate, Yemen. Dhi Al-Hawd and Ma'yin had a population of 4974 as of 2004.

References 

Sub-districts in Dhi As Sufal District